Daniel Augusto Caetano Dias (born 17 April 1961), better known as Daniel, is a retired footballer who played as a defender. Born in Praia. He started his football career in Portugal, then moved to Macau, which was Portuguese as well and is now a special administrative region of China. He also played in China as well, for Guangdong Hongyuan. He is also a former Macanese international footballer.

Career statistics

Club

Notes

International

References

https://sites.google.com/d/15aibqdkCNGBXrldfm1f2uA48OpZZCfF7/p/1ESx_wtILkzaZXxXFjt8FkJRqg0AxR3ID/edit

http://www.playmakerstats.com/player.php?id=393053;

https://www.foradejogo.net/player.php?player=196104170001

https://danielaugustocaetanodias.blogspot.com/2021/08/daniel-augusto-caetano-dias.html

https://danielaugustocaetanodias.blogspot.com/p/blog-page.html

Photo 
https://danielaugustocaetanodias.blogspot.com/2021/08/daniel-augusto-caetano-dias.html

https://danielaugustocaetanodias.blogspot.com/p/blog-page.html

https://sites.google.com/d/15aibqdkCNGBXrldfm1f2uA48OpZZCfF7/p/1ESx_wtILkzaZXxXFjt8FkJRqg0AxR3ID/edit

1961 births
Living people
Cape Verdean footballers
Cape Verdean expatriate footballers
Macau footballers
Macau international footballers
Portuguese footballers
Portuguese expatriate footballers
Association football defenders
Segunda Divisão players
Liga Portugal 2 players
F.C. Marco players
AD Fafe players
F.C. Felgueiras players
Associação Académica de Coimbra – O.A.F. players
C.D. Feirense players
C.D. Aves players
Guangdong Winnerway F.C. players
G.D. Lam Pak players
C.D. Monte Carlo players
South China AA players
Portuguese expatriate sportspeople in China
Expatriate footballers in China
Portuguese expatriate sportspeople in Hong Kong
Expatriate footballers in Hong Kong